The Maritimes and  Northeast Pipeline is a natural gas transmission  pipeline that runs from the Sable Offshore Energy Project (SOEP) gas plant in Goldboro, Nova Scotia, Canada to Dracut, Massachusetts, United States.

The  mainline pipeline runs  through the Canadian provinces of Nova Scotia and New Brunswick and the United States states of Maine, New Hampshire, and Massachusetts where it connects with the North American natural gas grid in Dracut.  There are four lateral pipelines located in New Brunswick and Nova Scotia to serve population and industrial centres.  The system has a capacity to carry 440 million cubic feet per day.  It is operated by Maritimes and Northeast Pipeline Management Limited of Halifax, Nova Scotia.

The pipeline came into operation in 2000. Prior to this, natural gas was selling for US$2.31 per million BTU in the New England market (February 2000). By December, the price was US$8.45 per million BTU. The abrupt rise in price was attributed to an increase in demand in New England. In contrast, the price of competing heating oil rose from 45 cents  to just 58 cents per litre over the same period.

Laterals

The pipeline has four Canadian laterals and five U.S. laterals:

Canadian Laterals:

 Point Tupper Lateral to the Sable Offshore Energy Project gas liquids separation plant - 60 km
 Halifax Lateral to Dartmouth at the Tuft's Cove Generating Station - 124 km
 Moncton Lateral - 12 km
 Saint John Lateral - 111 km

United States Laterals:

 Veazie Lateral
 Bucksport Lateral
 Westbrook Lateral
 Newington Lateral
 Haverhill Lateral

Owners
 Enbridge (77.53%)
 Emera Inc. (12.92%)
 ExxonMobil Canada (9.55%)

Possible connection to Golboro LNG

The Canadian firm Pieridae Energy is developing a $10 Billion investment plan to build an LNG terminal in Goldboro, Nova Scotia which would be connected to the M&NP pipeline. The project aims to export liquefied gas - LNG - overseas, especially to Germany as the project is backed by the German company Uniper.

References

External links
Maritimes & Northeast Pipeline official website
Maritimes & Northeast Pipeline Spectra Energy Profile
 Pipeline and Hazardous Materials Safety Administration Operator Report and Incidents Report

Buildings and structures in Guysborough County, Nova Scotia
Transport buildings and structures in Nova Scotia
Transport buildings and structures in New Brunswick
Energy in New England
Natural gas pipelines in Maine
Transportation buildings and structures in New Hampshire
Transportation buildings and structures in Massachusetts
Natural gas pipelines in Canada
Natural gas pipelines in the United States
Canada–United States relations
Enbridge pipelines
Emera
ExxonMobil